Bajiao Amusement Park station is a station on Line 1 of the Beijing Subway. It is near Beijing Shijingshan Amusement Park.

Station Layout 
The station has 2 underground side platforms.

Exits 
The station has two exits, lettered A and B. Both are accessible.

Gallery

References

Beijing Subway stations in Shijingshan District
Railway stations in China opened in 1971